Iskakovo (İsqaq) is a rural locality (a village) in Burangulovsky Selsoviet, Abzelilovsky District, Bashkortostan, Russia. The population was 178 as of 2010. There are three streets.

Geography 
Burangulovo is the nearest rural locality.

References 

Rural localities in Abzelilovsky District